North Kilkenny was a parliamentary constituency in Ireland, represented in the House of Commons of the Parliament of the United Kingdom. It returned one Member of Parliament (MP) from 1885 to 1922.

Boundaries and Boundary Changes
This constituency comprised the northern part of County Kilkenny.

Prior to the 1885 general election the area was part of the Kilkenny County constituency. In 1918 the constituency was redrawn as a result of the abolition of the Kilkenny City constituency.

1885–1918: The baronies of Crannagh, Fassadinin, Galmoy and Shillelogher, and that part of the barony of Gowran not contained within the South Kilkenny constituency.

1918–1922: The rural districts of Castecomer, Kilkenny and Urlingford No. 1, and the urban district of Kilkenny.

The constituency ceased to be entitled to be represented in the UK House of Commons on the dissolution of 26 October 1922, shortly before the Irish Free State came into legal existence on 6 December 1922.

First Dáil
The constituency was, in Irish republican theory, entitled to return one Teachta Dála (known in English as a Deputy) in 1918 to serve in the Irish Republic's First Dáil. Sinn Féin used the UK general election in 1918 to elect the Dáil. The revolutionary body assembled on 21 January 1919. The list of members read out on that day included everyone elected in Ireland. Only the Sinn Féin Deputies participated in the Dáil, but the other Irish MPs could have done so if they had chosen to adhere to the Republic.

The First Dáil, passed a motion at its last meeting on 10 May 1921, the first three parts of which make explicit the republican view.
 That the Parliamentary elections which are to take place during the present month be regarded as elections to Dáil Éireann.
 That all deputies duly returned at these elections be regarded as members of Dáil Éireann and allowed to take their seats on subscribing to the proposed Oath of Allegiance.
 That the present Dáil dissolve automatically as soon as the new body has been summoned by the President and called to order.

The Second Dáil first met on 16 August 1921, thereby dissolving the First Dáil.

Sinn Féin had decided to use the polls for the Northern Ireland House of Commons and the House of Commons of Southern Ireland as an election for the Irish Republic's Second Dáil. No actual voting was necessary in Southern Ireland as all the seats were filled by unopposed returns. Except for Dublin University all other constituencies elected Sinn Féin TDs. As with the First Dáil, the other Deputies could have joined the Dáil if they chose.

From the Third Dáil onwards the Dáil represented only the twenty-six counties which formed the Irish Free State.

In the 2nd and 3rd Dála Kilkenny North formed part of the Carlow–Kilkenny constituency.

Politics
The constituency was a safe nationalist/republican seat throughout its existence, from 1885 to 1922. Only three of the thirteen elections held in the seat (nine at general elections and four at by-elections) were contested.

A Conservative in 1885 (who polled only 174 votes) and a Unionist in 1892 (who received a not much larger 314 votes), were the only candidates from other political traditions to contest the seat.

The most hotly contested election was the 1890 North Kilkenny by-election. This was the first parliamentary election to take place in Ireland after the Irish Parliamentary Party split into Parnellite and Anti-Parnellite factions, in early December 1890. The two factions each nominated a candidate. The Anti-Parnellite won, on a 2,527 to 1,362 vote.

All elections in the constituency after its first decade of existence, starting with the 1895 United Kingdom general election, were uncontested. The Sinn Féin candidate, future President of the Executive Council of the Irish Free State W. T. Cosgrave (6 June 1880 – 16 November 1965), made an unopposed gain from the IPP in 1918.

Members of Parliament

Notes:-
 1 Not an election, but the date of a party change. The Irish Parliamentary Party had been created in 1882, on the initiative of Charles Stewart Parnell's Irish National League. Both the IPP and the INL split into Parnellite and Anti-Parnellite factions, in December 1890. The Parnellites remained members of the Irish National League after the split and the Anti-Parnellites organised the Irish National Federation in March 1891. The two organisations and the United Irish League merged in 1900, to re-create the Irish Parliamentary Party.
 2 Date of polling day. The result was declared on 28 December 1918, to allow time for votes cast by members of the armed forces to be included in the count (in contested seats).

Elections

Elections in the 1880s

Elections in the 1890s

Elections in the 1900s

Devlin was also elected as MP for Belfast West and instead opted to sit as an MP there, prompting a by-election.

Elections in the 1910s

See also
 Dáil Éireann (Irish Republic)
 Historic Dáil constituencies
 Kilkenny (constituency): parliamentary constituencies in County Kilkenny
 Members of the 1st Dáil

References

External links
 https://www.oireachtas.ie/en/members/

Westminster constituencies in County Kilkenny (historic)
Dáil constituencies in the Republic of Ireland (historic)
Constituencies of the Parliament of the United Kingdom established in 1885
Constituencies of the Parliament of the United Kingdom disestablished in 1922
Historic constituencies in County Kilkenny